is a 2001 Japanese animated adventure film based on the Digimon franchise created by Akiyoshi Hongo, and its third series, Digimon Tamers. The film is directed by Tetsuo Imazawa, written by Yasuko Kobayashi, and produced by Toei Animation. The film was released in Japan on July 14, 2001, as part of Toei Animation Summer 2001 Animation Fair, featuring alongside Mōtto! Ojamajo Doremi: The Secret of the Frog Stone and Kinnikuman: Second Generation films.

The film takes place during the Tamers' summer vacation, where Mephistomon sends Digimon to invade the Real World through a virus called the "V-Pet".

The film marks the first film for Digimon Tamers, and was followed by Runaway Locomon short film (2002).

Plot
As Takato and Jian arrives to Okinawa for their summer trip, they part ways as Takato stays with his cousin Kai and his grandfather, while Jian visiting the underwater ruins offshore. Meanwhile, Ruki, who's staying home in Tokyo, fights a Pteramon at an oil plant, with her and Renamon noticing a suspicious motive for its attacks. The next morning, Takato, Kai and Guilmon saves a girl named Minami from Tylomon. Minami explains to Takato later that night that she was being chased by many Digimons, because her laptop carried an original prototype V-Pet. Much later, Scorpiomon and Divermon tries captures Minami, but Seasarmon appears from the laptop screen and saves her, but Mantaraymon escapes with Minami.

Meanwhile, V-Pets are causing technical viruses around the globe, and taking over the entire computer system. Takato and the others goes to an island where Minami is held captive. Inside, Minami's father reveals that the prototype is carrying a vaccine program, and Tameshiro, the head of the V-Pet manufacturing company, is revealed to be a Digimon named Mephistomon that sent the Digimons to capture Minami. As Seasarmon tries to attack Mephistomon, he is bested and de-evolves to Labramon, resembling Minami's late puppy, Mei. Jian and Ruki arrives via Omegamon's help, who've revealed that it has been hunting for Mephistomon from the beginning.

Takato and the others fight and seemingly deletes Mephistomon, while Minami's cry over Labramon's death activates the vaccine, which cures the computer system over the world. Mephistomon evolves into Gulfmon and overpowers the partner Digimon. Culumon enables the partner Digimons to Ultimate-levels and defeats Gulfmon, setting everything back to normal.

Voice cast

Production
The film is directed by Digimon series episode director Tetsuo Imazawa, with Yasuko Kobayashi providing the screenplay, and Tadayoshi Yamamuro providing the character designs and animation direction for the film. The film's ending theme song is "Moving On!" by AiM, which peaked at #95 on the Oricon Weekly Singles Chart. An insert song in the film, was performed by Sammy and released as a single on September 29, 2001.

Release
The film was released in Japan on July 14, 2001, as part of Toei Animation Summer 2001 Animation Fair, and was featured alongside with Mōtto! Ojamajo Doremi: The Secret of the Frog Stone and Kinnikuman: Second Generation films. The film premiered on Jetix in the United States on September 16, 2005.

References

External link

2000s Japanese films
2001 anime films
Digimon films
Toei Animation films
Fantasy anime and manga